Bjørn Andressen (also spelled  Andreassen, 8 September 1946 – 27 January 2015) was a Norwegian ice hockey player. He was born in Oslo and represented the club Jar IL. He played for the Norwegian national ice hockey team, and  participated at the Winter Olympics in Sapporo in 1972, where the Norwegian team placed 8th.

References

1946 births
2015 deaths
Norwegian ice hockey players
Olympic ice hockey players of Norway
Ice hockey players at the 1972 Winter Olympics
Ice hockey people from Oslo